Bukit Mertajam may refer to:
Bukit Mertajam
Bukit Mertajam (federal constituency), represented in the Dewan Rakyat
Bukit Mertajam (state constituency), formerly represented in the Penang State Legislative Assembly (1959–74)
Pekan Bukit Mertajam (state constituency), formerly represented in the Penang State Legislative Assembly (1974–86)
Bukit Mertajam (settlement constituency), formerly represented in the Penang Settlement Council (1955–59)